The 2021–22 season is Portsmouth's 123rd year in existence and fifth consecutive season in League One. Along with the league, the club will also compete in the FA Cup, the EFL Cup and the EFL Trophy. The season covers the period from 1 July 2021 to 30 June 2022.

Players

Squad Details
As of 8 March 2022

Statistics

|}

Source:

Goals record

Assist record

Disciplinary record

Pre-season friendlies
Pompey announced they would play friendly matches against Havant & Waterlooville, Crystal Palace, Bristol City, Gosport Borough, Luton Town, Bognor Regis Town, Peterborough United and Bournemouth U23s as part of their pre-season preparations.

Competitions

League One

League table

Results summary

Results by matchday

Matches
Pompey's fixtures were announced on 24 June 2021.

FA Cup

Portsmouth were drawn at home against Harrow Borough in the first round and to Harrogate Town in the second round.

EFL Cup

Portsmouth were drawn away to Millwall in the first round.

EFL Trophy

Pompey were drawn into Southern Group B alongside AFC Wimbledon, Crystal Palace U21s and Sutton United. The group stage fixtures were confirmed on August, 23. In the knock-out stages, Portsmouth were drawn away to Cambridge United.

Hampshire Senior Cup

Pompey were drawn away to Basingstoke Town and AFC Stoneham in the second and third round respectively.

Transfers

Transfers in

Loans in

Loans out

Transfers out

References

Portsmouth
Portsmouth F.C. seasons